(), died , was a Nabataean (Aramaic-speaking, rural Iraqi) agriculturalist, toxicologist, and alchemist born in Qussīn, near Kufa in Iraq. He is the author of the Nabataean Agriculture, an influential Arabic work on agriculture, astrology, and magic.

Already by the end of the tenth century, various works were being falsely attributed to him.

Name

Just like the semi-legendary Jabir ibn Hayyan, he carried the   despite the fact that he is not known to have engaged in or to have written anything about Sufism.

Biography

Very little else is known about his life. Our main source of information are Ibn Wahshiyya's own writings, as well as the short entry in Ibn al-Nadim's (died ) , where he is explicitly said to be among the "authors whose life is not well known". Ibn Wahshiyya himself claimed to be a descendant of the Neo-Assyrian king Sennacherib, whom the rural, Aramaic-speaking population of southern Iraq (known to Arabic authors of Ibn Wahshiyya's time as 'Nabataeans') revered as their illustrious ancestor. Despite the fact that these Iraqi 'Nabataeans' (who are not to be confused with the ancient Nabataeans of Petra, with whom they have nothing in common) were generally looked down upon as lowly peasants, Ibn Wahshiyya identified himself as one of them. Ibn Wahshiyya's self-identifaction as 'Nabataean' seems credible given the accurate use of Aramaic terms in his works.

Works

Ibn Wahshiyya's works were written down and redacted after his death by his student and scribe Abū Ṭālib al-Zayyāt. They were used not only by later agriculturalists, but also by authors of works on magic like Maslama al-Qurṭubī (died 964, author of the Ghāyat al-ḥakīm, "The Aim of the Sage", Latin: Picatrix), and by philosophers like Maimonides (1138–1204) in his Dalālat al-ḥāʾirīn ("Guide for the Perplexed", c. 1190).

Ibn al-Nadim, in his Kitāb al-Fihrist (c. 987), lists approximately twenty works attributed to Ibn Wahshiyya. However, most of these were probably not written by Ibn Wahshiyya himself, but rather by other tenth-century authors inspired by him.

The Nabataean Agriculture

Ibn Wahshiyya's major work, the Nabataean Agriculture (Kitāb al-Filāḥa al-Nabaṭiyya, c. 904), claims to have been translated from an "ancient Syriac" original, written c. 20,000 years ago by the ancient inhabitants of Mesopotamia. In Ibn Wahshiyya's time, Syriac was thought to have been the primordial language used at the time of creation. While the work may indeed have been translated from a Syriac original, in reality Syriac is a language that only emerged in the first century. By the ninth century, it had become the carrier of a rich literature, including many works translated from the Greek. The book's extolling of Babylonian civilization against that of the conquering Arabs forms part of a wider movement (the Shu'ubiyya movement) in the early Abbasid period (750-945 CE), which witnessed the emancipation of non-Arabs from their former status as second-class Muslims.

Other Works

The Book of the Desire of the Maddened Lover for the Knowledge of Secret Scripts
Its author refers to his extensive travels in Egypt, but Ibn Wahshiyya himself seems never to have visited Egypt, a country which he barely even mentions in his authentic works. For this and other reasons, scholars believe the work to be spurious. According to Jaakko Hämeen-Anttila, it may have been authored by Hasan ibn Faraj, an obscure descendant of the Harranian Sabian scholar Sinan ibn Thabit ibn Qurra who claimed to have merely copied the work in the year 413 AH, corresponding to 1022–3 CE.

The Book of Poisons
Another work attributed to Ibn Wahshiyya is a treatise on toxicology called the Book of Poisons, which combines contemporary knowledge on pharmacology with magic and astrology.

Cryptography
The works attributed to Ibn Wahshiyya contain several cipher alphabets that were used to encrypt magic formulas.

Later influence

Pseudo-Ibn Wahshiyya's  ("The Book of the Desire of the Maddened Lover for the Knowledge of Secret Scripts", perhaps , see above), has been claimed by Egyptologist Okasha El-Daly to have correctly identified the phonetic value of a number of Egyptian hieroglyphs. However, other scholars have been highly sceptical about El-Daly's claims on the accuracy of these identifications, which betray a keen interest in (as well as some basic knowledge of) the nature of Egyptian hieroglyphs, but are in fact for the most part incorrect. 
The book may have been known to the German Jesuit scholar and polymath Athanasius Kircher (1602–1680), and was translated into English by Joseph von Hammer-Purgstall in 1806 as Ancient Alphabets and Hieroglyphic Characters Explained; with an Account of the Egyptian Priests, their Classes, Initiation, and Sacrifices in the Arabic Language by Ahmad Bin Abubekr Bin Wahishih.

See also
Alchemy
Alchemy and chemistry in the medieval Islamic world
History of agriculture
Ibn Abi Usaybi'a
Muslim Agricultural Revolution
Science in the medieval Islamic world
The Nabataean Agriculture (Ibn Wahshiyya's major work)

References

Bibliography

Further reading
 
  (on pseudo-Ibn Wahshiyya's )

External links
 Kitāb Shawq al-mustahām fī maʿrifat rumūz al-aqlām (1791)

Alchemists of the medieval Islamic world
Arab historians
Wahshiyah, Ibn
9th-century Arabs
10th-century Arabs
10th-century Arabic writers
9th-century Arabic writers
10th-century agronomists